Lonnie Chavis, Jr. (born November 23, 2007) is an American actor and activist. He is known for playing young Randall Pearson on NBC's drama, This Is Us. Chavis has been nominated for several awards and shared the win for the Screen Actors Guild Award for Outstanding Performance by an Ensemble in a Drama Series with his This Is Us cast mates. In 2017, he starred in Showtime's short lived sitcom White Famous. In 2020, Chavis starred in his first feature film, The Water Man.

Early life
Chavis was born on November 23, 2007 in Downey, California. Chavis is the son of Najah and Lonnie Chavis. He has three younger brothers. In 2016, the 8-year-old Chavis was nearly kidnapped from outside his home in Long Beach, California while taking out the trash. Chavis was able to fight off his would-be captors and alert a neighbor who then escorted him back home to his mom, who had already called the police. As of 2017, Chavis was homeschooled.

Career
In 2016, Chavis joined the cast This Is Us as a young version of Sterling K. Brown's Randall Pearson. In early 2017, Chavis appeared as a guest star in an episode of his favorite show, the Nickelodeon sitcom, The Thundermans. Later that year, Chavis appeared in an episode of The CW's Supergirl. In June 2017, Chavis was promoted to series regular in season 2 of This Is Us. Chavis would go on to star opposite Jay Pharoah in the comedy White Famous, executive produced by Jamie Foxx. Chavis revealed that the series was his first experience with improvisation. Chavis made his feature film debut in Disney's Magic Campwhich starred Adam DeVine. The 2018 theatrical release was cancelled and later streamed on Disney+. He also appeared in Kevin Hart's Guide to Black History which premiered on Netflix in 2019. Chavis also appeared in the short film Skin from Guy Nattiv. The film won the Academy Award for Best Live Action Short Film at the 91st Academy Awards.

In 2018, Chavis was cast opposite Jason Wiles in Sunny Daze, which Wiles wrote and directed. In 2019, Chavis was cast opposite Academy Award nominee David Oyelowo in Oyelowo's feature film directorial debut, The Water Man. With Chavis as the lead, the film also starred Rosario Dawson with Oprah Winfrey attached to executive produce. The film marked Chavis's feature film debut and he credited Oyelowo with making him a better actor. In 2020, Chavis was cast to star in The Boy Behind the Door, a thriller from the writing-directing team of David Charbonier and Justin Powell.

Activism
In June 2018, Chavis posted a video to Instagram in response to online bullying about the gap in his teeth. Chavis said, "Braces can fix [my teeth], but like, can you fix your heart, though?" While Chavis assured concerned fans that he could handle negative comments, not everyone could, he said, with some people even being driven to suicide. While his parents typically filtered the comments, the couple showed Chavis one comment and he decided to post the video. The video garnered over 600,000 views with friends and celebrities reposting it using Chavis's own hashtag: #FixYourHeart. In October 2018, Chavis partnered with Ad Council on an anti-bullying campaign. In 2020, Chavis said "This movement is about having the accountability to correct your own actions and be better to others." In 2021, the organization launched a clothing line, for which Chavis models.

In the wake of the Murder of George Floyd and the subsequent protests, Chavis, aged 12, wrote a letter to his mother about his experiences with racism in U.S. as he struggled to verbally express his feelings. The letter was later published by People on June 17, 2020.

Filmography

Film

Television

Awards and nominations

References

External links

2007 births
Living people
African-American actors
American male film actors
American male television actors
21st-century American male actors
People from Downey, California
21st-century African-American people